"The Election of 1800" is the nineteenth song from the second act of Hamilton, a Broadway musical that premiered in 2015 focused on the life of Alexander Hamilton. In "The Election of 1800", Jefferson and Burr's attempts to win the 1800 United States presidential election result in a tie that must be broken by Hamilton. "The Election of 1800" contains discrepancies between its story and the presidential election it narrates, most notably that Hamilton did not break the tie in the actual election.

Synopsis 
The song details Miranda's retelling of the 1800 United States presidential election. After the emotional ending of  the previous song, Thomas Jefferson lightens the mood by asking if they can "get back to politics" and James Madison (still crying) agrees. John Adams, who is not represented in the play, is said to have no chance of winning the presidency, therefore making the main contest of the race between Jefferson and Aaron Burr, both actively campaigning for the presidency. While Alexander Hamilton, the main character, is repeatedly questioned on who he would rather support, he refuses to answer. Hamilton briefly speaks with Burr, who says that he would do anything to achieve the presidency. When it becomes apparent that the race is tied, Hamilton is called upon to break the deadlock. To the shock of everyone else, he throws the election to Jefferson. While Hamilton admits that he and Jefferson have never agreed on anything, he reasons that "Jefferson has beliefs. Burr has none." Burr remains optimistic about still being vice president, but Jefferson uses his new power to change the law so the person in second place does not become vice president as he doesn't trust Burr. In the last line of the song, Jefferson gloatingly asks Burr to thank Hamilton for his endorsement of Jefferson. In the next number, "Your Obedient Servant", Burr challenges Hamilton to a duel out of anger for this endorsement.

Historical differences 
While Burr was portrayed in the song as running for president, it was widely understood at the time that Jefferson was the Democratic-Republican Party's presidential candidate, whereas Burr was running for vice president. Burr did, however, noticeably decline to say that he would not accept the presidency if he were elected.

The tie between Jefferson and Burr was the result of a flaw in the original rules of the electoral college, the constitutional process that allows for the election of the president and vice president. Under the original rules, each elector would cast two ballots—the candidate with the most votes would become president, while the runner-up becomes vice president. However, when political parties began to run both  presidential and vice presidential candidates, it became apparent that the election would result in a tie between Jefferson and Burr, since they were from the same political party and would each receive one vote from every elector from a state the two had won. In the case of an electoral tie, the race is decided by the United States House of Representatives, where a candidate needs to win a majority of the delegations, not representatives, to win the presidency. In a plot to undermine the Democratic-Republican Party, the delegations controlled by the Federalist Party cast their votes for Burr, preventing both Jefferson and Burr from reaching the nine out of sixteen congressional delegations required to win. While Alexander Hamilton was lobbying Federalist delegations to vote for Jefferson, largely for the reasons laid out in the song, it was Representative James Bayard of Delaware who cast the deciding vote to elect Jefferson to the presidency.

While Madison tells Jefferson near the end of the song that Jefferson won the election in a landslide, the Tampa Bay Times points out that this was not the case.

Reaction and impact 
Writing for the Journal of the Early Republic, Nancy Isenberg criticized the accuracy of the song, writing that the event had been "distorted beyond recognition" by Miranda.

In Chiafalo v. Washington, a case before the Supreme Court of the United States, Justice Elena Kagan alluded to "The Election of 1800" in handing down her decision. While writing about past contested presidential elections, Kagan parenthetically commented that "Alexander Hamilton secured his place on the Broadway stage—but possibly in the cemetery too—by lobbying Federalists in the House to tip the election to Jefferson".

Reprisal 

In 2020, cast members from Hamilton performed modified lyrics for "The Election of 1800", among other songs, to encourage turnout in the 2020 United States elections in partnership with When We All Vote, an initiative started by Michelle Obama. Instead of singing about the contest between Jefferson and Burr, the new lyrics emphasize the importance of the then-upcoming election. For example, while the original lyrics when Hamilton was first approached about Jefferson and Burr were "Dear Mr. Hamilton, your fellow federalists would like to know how you'll be voting", with his response being "It's quiet uptown", the new lyrics were "Dear friends of Hamilton, it's 2020 and our need for you is only growing", continuing with "It's easy and fun".

References 

2015 songs
Songs from Hamilton (musical)